Laurel Mill and Col. Jordan Jones House is a historic home and grist mill located near Gupton, Franklin County, North Carolina.  The house was built about 1850, and is a one-story Greek Revival / Italianate style frame cottage over a raised brick basement. The frame mill building is two stories tall supported by large stone piers.  The mill building extends over Sandy Creek.  The house and mill are all that remains of the ambitious local industrial complex.

It was listed on the National Register of Historic Places in 1975.

References

Grinding mills in North Carolina
Grinding mills on the National Register of Historic Places in North Carolina
Houses on the National Register of Historic Places in North Carolina
Houses completed in 1850
Italianate architecture in North Carolina
Greek Revival houses in North Carolina
Houses in Franklin County, North Carolina
National Register of Historic Places in Franklin County, North Carolina